In five-dimensional Euclidean geometry, the cyclotruncated 5-simplex honeycomb or cyclotruncated hexateric honeycomb is a space-filling tessellation (or honeycomb). It is composed of 5-simplex, truncated 5-simplex, and bitruncated 5-simplex facets in a ratio of 1:1:1.

Structure
Its vertex figure is an elongated 5-cell antiprism, two parallel 5-cells in dual configurations, connected by 10 tetrahedral pyramids (elongated 5-cells) from the cell of one side to a point on the other. The vertex figure has 8 vertices and 12 5-cells.

It can be constructed as six sets of parallel hyperplanes that divide space. The hyperplane intersections generate  cyclotruncated 5-cell honeycomb divisions on each hyperplane.

Related polytopes and honeycombs

See also
Regular and uniform honeycombs in 5-space:
5-cubic honeycomb
5-demicubic honeycomb
 5-simplex honeycomb
 Omnitruncated 5-simplex honeycomb

Notes

References 
 Norman Johnson Uniform Polytopes, Manuscript (1991)
 Kaleidoscopes: Selected Writings of H.S.M. Coxeter, edited by F. Arthur Sherk, Peter McMullen, Anthony C. Thompson, Asia Ivic Weiss, Wiley-Interscience Publication, 1995,  
 (Paper 22) H.S.M. Coxeter, Regular and Semi Regular Polytopes I, [Math. Zeit. 46 (1940) 380-407, MR 2,10] (1.9 Uniform space-fillings)
 (Paper 24) H.S.M. Coxeter, Regular and Semi-Regular Polytopes III, [Math. Zeit. 200 (1988) 3-45]

Honeycombs (geometry)
6-polytopes